Gravel Hill is a historic plantation house located near Charlotte Court House, Charlotte County, Virginia.  It was built in 1847, and is a two-story, three-bay frame dwelling in the Greek Revival style. A two-story frame addition was built in 1912. It features a two-story pedimented Doric order portico.  Also on the property are a contributing -story, log guest house typical of the picturesque "rustic lodge" structures of the 1920s; large wooden barn on a stone foundation; and smokehouse.

It was listed on the National Register of Historic Places in 2001.

References

Plantation houses in Virginia
Houses on the National Register of Historic Places in Virginia
Greek Revival houses in Virginia
Houses completed in 1847
Houses in Charlotte County, Virginia
National Register of Historic Places in Charlotte County, Virginia
1847 establishments in Virginia